Frank Nutinous Edwards (March 1, 1904 – March 1977) was an American baseball catcher in the Negro leagues. He played with the St. Louis Stars in 1937. His son, Weedy Edwards, also played in the Negro leagues.

References

External links
 and Seamheads

St. Louis Stars (1937) players
1904 births
1977 deaths
Baseball players from St. Louis
Baseball catchers
20th-century African-American sportspeople